Kirovskyi District may refer to any of the following administrative divisions of Ukraine:
 Kirovskyi District, an urban district of Donetsk.